The Osprey 55-class gunboat is a Danish-designed class of naval ship currently in service in the Hellenic Navy and Royal Moroccan Navy. Two ships were ordered by Greece in March 1988 and built by Hellenic Shipyards. The first one was laid down on 8 May 1989 and launched on 19 December 1989. The second ship was laid down on 9 November 1989 and launched on 16 May 1990. Armament is of modular design and therefore can be changed.  guns replaced the Bofors  guns in 1995, after being taken from decommissioned s. Options on more of the class were shelved in favour of the slightly larger .

Four other ships were ordered by the Royal Moroccan Navy all received between 1987 and 1990. Built in Frederikshavn, Denmark, they were only armed with one Bofors 40 mm and two Oerlikon 20 mm cannon. El Lahiq is equipped with a cartographic sonar and North American navigation systems for hydrographic research.

Incidents at sea
On 4 May 2018 a Turkish-flagged cargo ship named Karmate (IMO: 8135461, MMSI: 271002030)  collided with HS Armatolos P-18 off the coast of the island of Lesbos, while the gunboat was participating in a NATO mission (called Aegean Activity for controlling migrant flows into the Aegean) in the Aegean Sea. According to available information, before the collision the captain of the gunboat sounded warning horns and sent repeated radio messages but there was no response from the Turkish ship while the Turkish ship violated maritime safety rules (like giving priority to a military vessel). The damage to the Greek gunboat was very small according to the available information from the Greek minister of defence.

Ships

References

Sources
 
 
 Hellenic Navy website

Gunboat classes
Naval ships of Greece
Patrol vessels of the Hellenic Navy
Patrol vessels of Morocco
Patrol boat classes